James McCaffrey  is a former basketball player who played collegiately at Holy Cross and was a 6th round selection in the 1986 NBA draft. A native of Rutland, Vermont, he was named one of Sports Illustrated's  Greatest Sports Figures from the State of Vermont.

High school career
A prolific scorer at Rutland High School, McCaffrey scored 1,111 points in two varsity seasons, and guided the Red Raiders to back-to-back state title game appearances at Patrick Gym. McCaffrey scored 55 points in single game in 1981, which is fifth all-time in Vermont state high school boys basketball history. He also set a single-game state tournament scoring record with a 48-point performance and earned all-state honors after averaging 30 points per game.

College career
McCaffrey spend the first two seasons of his college career at in-state institution St. Michael's College where he led the team in scoring for two seasons, including 21 points per game his second year. McCaffrey transferred to Holy Cross and in his first season with the Crusaders, he averaged 21.7 points per game en route to Metro Atlantic Athletic Conference first-team all-conference honors. In his senior season, McCaffrey bumped his scoring average to 22.8 points per game, and was named tournament MVP at the 1986 MAAC men's basketball tournament as well as picking up first-team all-conference honors again. McCaffrey also set the Hart Center scoring record with a 45-point performance against Iona in 1985, which earned him Sports Illustrated Player of the Week Honors. He finished his Holy Cross career with 1,178 points and as of 2017 ranks 4th all-time in scoring average (22.2), 6th all-time in free-throw percentage (.808) and is the all-time leader in average minutes played (35.5).

Post-college
After college, McCaffrey was taken in the sixth round of the 1986 NBA draft by the Phoenix Suns. He was released in training camp by the Suns, and also attended camp with the Boston Celtics. McCaffrey played the 1987 season with the Cincinnati Slammers of the Continental Basketball Association, and also played in the United States Basketball League.

He also appeared in Nestlé Crunch ad alongside Larry Bird after graduating from college, playing the role of a custodian. McCaffrey was inducted into the Holy Cross athletic hall of fame in 1992 and the New England Basketball Hall of Fame in 2003. He was also a member of the Vermont Sports Hall of Fame Class of 2015.

Personal life
McCaffrey currently works in the finance in London. His children were all collegiate athletes; son James played football at Boston College, while younger son Mike played at Holy Cross. McCaffrey's daughter Stephanie was also a standout women's soccer player at Boston College, and is a former professional and international soccer player.

References

Living people
American men's basketball players
Basketball players from Vermont
Cincinnati Slammers players
Holy Cross Crusaders men's basketball players
People from Rutland (city), Vermont
Phoenix Suns draft picks
Saint Michael's Purple Knights men's basketball players
Year of birth missing (living people)